Captured Angel is the third album by American singer-songwriter Dan Fogelberg, released in 1975. He promoted the album with a tour in support of The Eagles.

The album peaked at No. 23 on the Billboard 200. It has sold more than a million copies.

Production
The album was produced by Fogelberg. He alone recorded all of the instrumental parts before being convinced by his label to allow for a few re-recordings and contributions by other musicians. The majority of the album was recorded at a studio in South Pekin, Illinois; Fogelberg had returned home to care for his ill father.

Critical reception
Stereo Review praised Fogelberg's musicianship, but wrote that as a singer "he sounds raw, unsure, and at times even amateurish, particularly when any emotionality is involved."

Track listing
All songs written by Dan Fogelberg.

Side one
"Aspen/These Days" – 7:39
"Comes and Goes" – 2:25
"Captured Angel" – 2:57
"Old Tennessee" – 3:07
"Next Time" – 4:10

Side two
"Man in the Mirror/ Below the Surface" – 7:10
"Crow" – 4:40
"The Last Nail" – 5:30

Personnel
Dan Fogelberg – banjo, bass guitar (except on "Captured Angel", "Old Tennessee" and "Next Time"), guitar, harmonica, percussion (except on "Comes and Goes", keyboards, lead and backing vocals, ARP synthesizer
Hot Damn Brothers – backing vocals on "Next Time"
Russ Kunkel – drums, percussion on "Comes and Goes"
David Lindley – fiddle on "Crow"
Al Perkins – pedal steel guitar on "Next Time"
Norbert Putnam – bass on "Captured Angel", "Old Tennessee" and "Next Time"
J.D. Souther – backing vocals on "Next Time"
Glen Spreen – string arrangements on "Aspen", "Next Time" and "The Last Nail"

Production
 Producer – Dan Fogelberg
 Engineers – Tom Byler, Jeff Guercio, Terry Jamison, Gary Ladinsky and John Stronach.
 Recorded at Golden Voice Studios (South Pekin, IL); Caribou Ranch (Nederland, CO); Record Plant LA (Los Angeles, CA); Record Plant (Sausalito, CA).
 Mixed by John Stronach at Record Plant (Sausalito, CA).
 Mastered by Rick Collins at Kendun Recorders (Burbank, CA).
 Design – Ron Coro
 Photography – Henry Diltz
 Cover Artwork – Dan Fogelberg

Charts
Album – Billboard (North America)

References

Dan Fogelberg albums
1975 albums